The Indian glass barb (Laubuka laubuca), is a cyprinid fish in the family Cyprinidae found in Pakistan, India, Bangladesh, Sri Lanka, Myanmar, Nepal and Indonesia. This species is reported in Mekong and Chao Phraya.

References

Fish of Thailand
Laubuka
Fish described in 1822
Taxa named by Francis Buchanan-Hamilton